Elope If You Must is a 1922 American comedy film directed by C.R. Wallace and written by Joseph F. Poland. The film stars Eileen Percy, A. Edward Sutherland, Joseph Bennett, Mildred Davenport, Mary Huntress and Harvey Clark. The film was released on April 2, 1922, by Fox Film Corporation.

Plot

Cast           
Eileen Percy as Nancy Moore
A. Edward Sutherland as Jazz Hennessy 
Joseph Bennett as Willie Weems
Mildred Davenport as Elizabeth Magruder
Mary Huntress as Mrs. Magruder
Harvey Clark as Mr. Magruder
Larry Steers as Warren Holt

References

External links
 

1922 films
1920s English-language films
Silent American comedy films
1922 comedy films
Fox Film films
American silent feature films
American black-and-white films
Films with screenplays by Joseph F. Poland
1920s American films